Walter Ward (1869 – after 1890) was an English professional footballer born in Birmingham who played in the Football Alliance for Small Heath. During the 1890–91 season, Ward deputised for regular goalkeeper Chris Charsley when Charsley's duties as a serving police officer demanded his absence from the side.

References

1869 births
Year of death missing
Footballers from Birmingham, West Midlands
English footballers
Association football goalkeepers
Birmingham City F.C. players
Date of birth missing
Place of death missing
Football Alliance players